TSN Airport may refer to:

Tan Son Nhat International Airport, Vietnam
Tianjin Binhai International Airport, China,